The David di Donatello Award for Best Screenplay (Italian: David di Donatello per la migliore sceneggiatura) was a film award presented by the Accademia del Cinema Italiano (ACI, Academy of Italian Cinema) to recognize outstanding screenwriting in a film released in Italy during the year preceding the ceremony. The award was presented annually from 1975 to 2016, when it was split between the Adapted and Original Screenplay categories.

Nominees and winners were selected via runoff voting by all the members of the Accademia.

Winners and nominees
Below, winners are listed first in the colored row, followed by other nominees.

1970s

1980s

1990s

2000s

2010s

See also 
 Nastro d'Argento for Best Screenplay
 Cinema of Italy

References

External links
 
 Daviddidonatello.it (official website)

David di Donatello
Screenwriting awards for film